Santuyanu is one of six parishes (administrative divisions) in Les Regueres, a municipality within the province and autonomous community of Asturias, in northern Spain.

The population is 358 (INE 2015).

Villages
 Andayón
 Ania
 Llazana
 Oteru
 Santuyanu (capital)
 Trescañeu
 Viau

References 

Parishes in Las Regueras